Thelonious Monk at the Blackhawk is an album by jazz pianist Thelonious Monk. It was originally issued on the Riverside label as RLP 12-323 (mono)/1171 (stereo) and Original Jazz Classics OJCCD 305–2 in 1987.

Origins of the album
Riverside Records had originally planned for the album to be co-led by drummer Shelly Manne. Manne's career was at a high point in 1960, and his quintet released four albums recorded live at the Blackhawk that year. (A fifth album from the recording sessions, which took place in 1959, was released in 1991.)  Three tracks of Monk's group with Manne playing drums were recorded at the Blackhawk with Manne on April 28, 1960. These tracks remained unissued until the release of Thelonious Monk: The Complete Riverside Recordings in 1986. The tracks recorded with Manne were "'Round Midnight", "Just You, Just Me" and "San Francisco Holiday" (a.k.a. "Worry Later"). Contrary to some published accounts, these tracks do include guest musicians Joe Gordon and Harold Land alongside Monk's regular band members Charlie Rouse and John Ore. Producer Orrin Keepnews felt that the group with Manne playing drums was not musically successful, and Manne agreed and withdrew from the project. Keepnews then called in Billy Higgins as a last-minute replacement for Manne. Higgins, who was based in Los Angeles during this period, had recently garnered national recognition as a member of the Ornette Coleman quartet in 1959 and 1960.

Track listing
All pieces by Thelonious Monk unless otherwise noted.

Original LP 

Side One
 Let's Call This - 8:32
 Four in One - 8:37
 I'm Getting Sentimental Over You" (George Bassman, Ned Washington) - 6:07

Side Two
 Worry Later - 9:09
 'Round Midnight" (Monk, Cootie Williams, Bernie Hanighen) - 12:06
 Epistrophy (Closing Theme) - 2:00

CD Re-issue 
"Let's Call This" – 8:33
"Four in One" – 8:41
"I'm Getting Sentimental Over You" (George Bassman, Ned Washington) – 6:14
"Epistrophy" (Monk, Kenny Clarke) – 6:41
"Evidence" – 7:09
"San Francisco Holiday (Worry Later)" – 9:10
"'Round Midnight" (Monk, Cootie Williams, Bernie Hanighen) – 12:07
"Epistrophy" – 0:59

Personnel
Joe Gordon - trumpet
Harold Land - tenor saxophone
Charlie Rouse - tenor saxophone
Thelonious Monk – piano
John Ore - bass
Billy Higgins - drums

Production
Reice Hamel - Recording Engineer

References

1960 live albums
Albums produced by Orrin Keepnews
Thelonious Monk live albums
Riverside Records live albums
Albums recorded at the Black Hawk (nightclub)